The Critical Race Studies in Education Association is an American interdisciplinary organization dedicated to the study of critical race theory and the promotion of racial justice in education. It was founded in 2007 and has held a conference annually since then.

References

External links

Educational organizations based in the United States
Critical race theory
Organizations established in 2007
2007 establishments in the United States